The  is a concert hall, theater and museum located in Shibuya, Tokyo, Japan, operated by Tokyu Group.

Venues 
The four main venues are:
Orchard Hall: 2,150 seats
Theatre Cocoon: 747 seats
The Museum - Changing art exhibits
Le Cinèma: movie theaters

See also 
Tokyo Philharmonic Orchestra
Tokyo International Film Festival

External links 
 
 In English

Music venues in Tokyo
Theatres in Tokyo
Concert halls in Japan
Arts centres in Japan
Art museums and galleries in Tokyo
Buildings and structures in Shibuya